The 1999 Cardiff Council election was the second election to the post-1996 Cardiff Council following the re-organization of local government in Wales. It was held on Thursday 6 May 1999. It was preceded by the 1995 election and followed by the 2004 elections. On the same day the first elections to the Welsh Assembly were held as well as elections to the other 21 local authorities in Wales. Labour retained a majority of the seats.

Overview
All council seats were up for election. This was the second election to be held following local government reorganisation and the abolition of South Glamorgan County Council. In 1995 the ward boundaries for the new authority were based on the previous Cardiff City Council but, effective from the 1999 election, The City and County of Cardiff (Electoral Arrangements) Order 1998 increased the number of wards to 29 and the number of councillors to 75.

Five new seats were created by adding additional seats to five existing wards. Labour won three of the new seats and the Liberal Democrats took the remaining two.

Outcome
The Labour Party won a comfortable majority of seats although it lost some ground compared to the inaugural elections four years previously. Of the 67 councillors elected in 1995, 43 were again returned in 1999 (38 Labour, 4 Liberal Democrat and 1 Plaid Cymru).

Betty Campbell, a community campaigner, former headteacher and Butetown councillor between 1991 and 1995, was the only independent councillor elected.

|}

Ward Results

Adamstown (2 seats)

Butetown (1 seat)

Caerau (2 seats)

Canton (3 seats)

Cathays (4 seats)
An additional fourth seat was created in this ward.

Creigiau & St. Fagans (1 seat)

Cyncoed (3 seats)

Ely (3 seats)

Fairwater (3 seats)

Gabalfa (2 seats)
An additional second seat was created in this ward.

Grangetown (3 seats)

Heath (3 seats)

Lisvane (1 seat)

Llandaff (2 seats)

Llandaff North (2 seats)

Llanishen (4 seats)
An additional fourth seat was created in this ward.

Llanrumney (3 seats)

Pentwyn (4 seats)
An additional fourth seat was created in this ward.

Pentyrch (1 seat)

Penylan (3 seats)

Plasnewydd (4 seats)

Pontprennau & Old St. Mellons (2 seats)

Radyr (1 seat)

Rhiwbina (3 seats)

Riverside (3 seats)

Rumney (2 seats)

Splott (3 seats)
An additional third seat was created in this ward.

Trowbridge (3 seats)
An additional third seat was created in this ward.

Whitchurch & Tongwynlais (4 seats)

By-elections between 1999 and 2004

Cyncoed

The by-election was called following the resignation of Cllr. Jenny Randerson.

Canton

The by-election was called following the election of Cllr. Kevin Brennan as the Member for the Parliamentary constituency of Cardiff West.

Llandaff North

Gabalfa

Pentwyn

The by-election was called following the resignation of Cllr. Bill Cookson.

References

1999
1999 Welsh local elections
1990s in Cardiff